Alvin Joseph Brooks III (born September 11, 1979) is an American college basketball coach currently serving his sixth season as an assistant coach at Baylor University under head coach Scott Drew. He joined the BU staff on April 8, 2016, after spending the previous four seasons as an assistant coach at Kansas State. Brooks is the son of current Lamar head coach Alvin Brooks.

Early life and education
Born in Houston, Brooks played two seasons at Midland College from 1998 to 2000. Brooks helped the Midland Chaparrals finish sixth place in the 2000 National Junior College Athletic Association (NJCAA) Tournament.

Brooks transferred to Idaho State, where played under head coach Doug Oliver from 2000 to 2002. As a senior, Brooks earned Academic All-Big Sky Conference honors and graduated with a bachelor's degree in finance in 2002 followed by a master's degree in athletics administration in 2003.

Career
Brooks began his career as a coach at the junior college level, starting as an assistant at Arkansas–Fort Smith from 2004 to 2006, including the 2006 NJCAA championship team. Brooks returned to Midland College as an assistant for the 2006–2007 season.

In 2007, Brooks moved up to the Division I level as an assistant and recruiting at Bradley University under Jim Les. In three seasons at Bradley, Brooks helped Bradley advance to the final round of the 2008 College Basketball Invitational and win 20 or more games in two seasons. In 2010, Brooks left Bradley to be an assistant at Sam Houston State for head coach Jason Hooten.

After working four years as an assistant at Kansas State under Bruce Weber, Brooks left after the 2015–16 season for a similar role at Baylor under Scott Drew.

References

External links
 Baylor profile

1979 births
Living people
20th-century African-American sportspeople
21st-century African-American sportspeople
African-American basketball coaches
African-American basketball players
American men's basketball players
Arkansas–Fort Smith Lions basketball coaches
Basketball coaches from Texas
Basketball players from Houston
Baylor Bears men's basketball coaches
Idaho State Bengals men's basketball players
Junior college men's basketball coaches in the United States
Midland Chaps basketball players
Kansas State Wildcats men's basketball coaches
Point guards